Jason Niblett (born 18 February 1983 in Horsham, Victoria) is an Australian professional racing cyclist. He was an Australian Institute of Sport scholarship holder.

Niblett served as pilot to Kieran Modra at the 2014 Commonwealth Games in Glasgow, Scotland, where the pair won two silver medals in the Men's tandem sprint B and Men's tandem time trial. In November 2014, Niblett and Modra were awarded the South Australian Institute of Sport Male Athlete with a Disability of the Year award.

Career highlights

2000
1st Team Sprint, World Championships – Juniors
2001
1st Team Sprint, World Championships – Juniors
2004
1st Team Sprint, Oceania Games, Melbourne
2005
1st Team Sprint, Australian National Track Championships, Adelaide
2006
2nd Sprint, Oceania Games, Melbourne
2nd Team Sprint, Oceania Games, Melbourne
2008
3rd Team Sprint, World Cup, Los Angeles
2010
1st Team Sprint, Commonwealth Games, Delhi

References

External links

1983 births
Australian Institute of Sport cyclists
Australian male cyclists
Commonwealth Games gold medallists for Australia
Commonwealth Games silver medallists for Australia
Cyclists at the 2010 Commonwealth Games
Cyclists at the 2014 Commonwealth Games
Living people
Cyclists from Victoria (Australia)
Australian track cyclists
Commonwealth Games medallists in cycling
South Australian Sports Institute alumni
Medallists at the 2010 Commonwealth Games
Medallists at the 2014 Commonwealth Games